Julio César Hurtado, nicknamed Cacho (born December 25, 1983), is a retired Bolivian footballer whose last club was Guabirá in the Bolivian league.

Club career
Nicknamed "Cacho", Hurtado saw his football career start off playing for his hometown club Blooming. After a season of inconsistency and lack of playing time, he was loaned to La Paz F.C. where he earned his place in the starting line-up from the beginning. Since his level improved, Blooming decided to bring him back for the 2006 season, but he did not live up to the expectations. In 2007, he transferred to The Strongest. As an atigrado Hurtado played in 24 games and scored one goal, but before the season ended he was expelled from the team due to insubordination acts. Willing to clean up his image, he joined Aurora in 2008, and since his arrival he became one of the key players for the team. During the Clausura 2008, Hurtado helped Aurora obtain the first national title in club history after defeating Blooming in the finals. After two seasons loaned at Aurora, Hurtado returned to Blooming for his third stint. On April 28, 2010 while playing a league match against San José, Hurtado found himself involved in an argument with the referee. Consequently, he used violent language and attempted to assault him if it wasn't for his teammates´intervention. Two weeks later, he received a 20-game suspension by league officials.

International career
Hurtado received his first and only call-up to the Bolivia national team for a 2010 World Cup Qualifier match to play against Colombia in Bogotá on March 28, 2009.

Honours

References

External links
 Base de Datos del Fútbol Argentino
 
 

1983 births
Living people
Sportspeople from Santa Cruz de la Sierra
Association football midfielders
Bolivian footballers
Bolivia international footballers
Club Blooming players
La Paz F.C. players
The Strongest players
Club Aurora players
Guabirá players